Kohli is a Khatri clan from Punjab.

The clan is a member of the Khukhrain of the Punjabi Khatri sub-caste, the other eight members being Anand, Sahni/Sawhney, Sethi, Ghai, Bhasin, Sabharwal, Chadha and Suri. They were concentrated in Bhera, Rawalpindi, Cambellpore (Chhachh) and Hazara before the partition of India in 1947. The neighborhood Kohlian da Mohalla (Mohalla Kohlian Wala) in Bhera, Punjab, Pakistan is named after the clan.

Fateh Singh Chhachhi and Sher Singh Chhachhi served under Maharaja Ranjit Singh as generals where they participated in the conquest of Pind Dadan Khan, Pindi Gheb and Jhang.

See also 

 Virat Kohli

References

Khatri clans
Indian surnames
Pakistani names
Punjabi-language surnames
Hindu surnames
Punjabi tribes